The 2016 Michigan State Spartans football team represented Michigan State University during the 2016 NCAA Division I FBS football season. The Spartans played in the East Division of the Big Ten Conference and played their home games at Spartan Stadium in East Lansing, Michigan. They were led by head coach Mark Dantonio, who was in his tenth season. They finished the season 3–9, 1–8 in Big Ten play to finish in sixth place in the East Division.

The season marked a major disappointment for the Spartans as it was their first losing season under Dantonio and the school's first losing season since 2006. As a result, the team was not bowl eligible. The Spartans had only lost five games in the three prior years combined, but had reached five losses by their seventh game.

Previous season
The Spartans finished 2015 season 12–2, 7–1 in Big Ten play to share the East Division championship with Ohio State. Due to their head-to-head win over Ohio State, they represented the East Division in the Big Ten Championship Game where they defeated West Division champion Iowa to become Big Ten Champions. They finished the season No. 3 in the College Football Playoff rankings and were selected to play in the CFP Semifinals at the Cotton Bowl Classic where they lost to No. 2 Alabama.

The season was one of the most successful in school history. The Spartans defeated in-state rival Michigan in Ann Arbor after a fumbled snap by Wolverine punter Blake O'Neill was picked up by Jalen Watts-Jackson and returned for a touchdown in the final ten seconds to give Michigan State a 27–23 win. The Spartans defeated Ohio State on the road in Columbus, playing without Connor Cook and relying on the arms of backup QBs Damion Terry and Tyler O'Connor. Michael Geiger would make a 41-yard field goal as time expired to give the Spartans a 17–14 win and to win the East Division. Michigan State would win its third Big Ten Championship in six years after defeating Iowa in the Big Ten Championship Game, 16–13. The Spartans were selected to play in the College Football Playoff, where they were defeated by eventual National Champion Alabama, 38–0, finishing with a 12–2 record and achieving their fifth 11-win season in six years.

Offseason

2016 NFL draft

2016 CFL draft

Undrafted NFL free agents

Recruiting class

Departures
The Spartans suffered heavy losses on the defensive line in the off-season. It was announced in April that Sophomores Craig Evans and Montez Sweat would be leaving the team for personal reasons. The following month, Damon Knox declined to take a sixth year of eligibility in order to pursue a career in law enforcement. In late August, RS Freshman Enoch Smith Jr. and Sophomore Cassius Peat would transfer out; Peat would transfer to East Arizona, and Smith would transfer to Butler Community College in Kansas.

Coaching staff

Roster

Schedule
Michigan State announced its 2016 football schedule on July 11, 2013. The 2016 schedule consists of seven  home and five road games in the regular season. The Spartans will host Big Ten foes Michigan, Northwestern, Ohio State, Rutgers, and Wisconsin, and will travel to Illinois, Indiana, Maryland, and Penn State. The team will host two of the three non–conference games, versus BYU and Notre Dame, both Independent, and FCS-school Furman from the Southern Conference.

Schedule Source:

Game summaries

Furman

The Spartans opened their 2016 season under the lights against FCS opponent Furman, the last time the Spartans will play an FCS opponent in the foreseeable future as the Big Ten has agreed to no longer schedule FCS opponents following this season.

The Spartans came out strong, scoring on their opening drive as L.J. Scott carried the ball four times for 33 yards, capping the drive with a one-yard touchdown run to give Michigan State an early 7–0 lead. The remainder of the quarter was a defensive struggle as both teams failed to move the ball effectively. Michigan State had an opportunity to extend their lead late in the quarter, however, Michael Geiger missed on a 43-yard field goal attempt, and the score remained 7–0 Michigan State heading into the second quarter.

Both offenses continued to struggle during the 2nd quarter, as neither offense could put a successful drive together until midway through the quarter when Michigan State completed an eight-play, 57-yard drive which culminated with a 13-yard Tyler O'Connor touchdown pass to Felton Davis III to take the lead 14–0. Furman would respond with a field goal following a 13-play, 73-yard drive to finally get on the board. At halftime, MSU led 14–3.

Furman received the ball to begin the second half and drove to the MSU 33-yard line before Jon Croft Hollingsworth missed a 50-yard field goal attempt. The Spartans turned the ball back over to Furman via a fumble by Darrell Stewart Jr. on the very first play of next possession. Furman took advantage and kicked a 23-yard field goal, reducing MSU's lead to 14–6. MSU responded with a five play, 58-yard touchdown drive capped by a Josiah Price 21-yard touchdown catch from Tyler O'Connor extending the Spartan lead to 21–6 heading into the fourth quarter.

Furman answered on an Antonio Wilcox six-yard touchdown run capping off an 11 play, 73-yard drive. The Spartans responded throwing an interception on their first possession of the fourth quarter, giving the Paladins favorable field position and an opportunity to tie the game. However, Andrew Dowell picked off P.J. Blazejowski on the first play of the possession to give the Spartans the ball right back. The Michigan State offense made up for the turnover by going on a 12 play, 60-yard drive, with Tyler O'Connor throwing a 12-yard touchdown pass to Jamal Lyles to give the Spartans a 28–13 lead. Furman turned the ball over on downs their next possession and Michigan State would run out the clock to end the game.

With the win, Michigan State won their eighth straight season opener and remained undefeated in home-openers under Mark Dantonio (10–0). Josiah Price recorded his 17th career touchdown reception, moving him up to seventh on the all time touchdown reception list in program history. Senior wide receiver R.J. Shelton, who came into the game as the starting receiver for the Spartans, was taken out of the game early after a punt return due to a tweaked hamstring; this was mainly done as a precaution. Starting linebacker Jon Reschke was also sidelined due to an apparent hand injury and did not play at all; both injuries were said to be minor. The Spartans played an unusually sloppy game, committing two turnovers and 10 penalties for 120 yards, many of which stunted momentum on several offensive possessions and extended several Furman offensive possessions. Tyler O'Connor completed 13 of 18 passes for 190 yards and three TDs. L.J. Scott rushed for 105 yards on 20 carries with one touchdown. Senior wide-out Monty Madaris caught five passes for 85 yards to lead the team in receiving.

Notre Dame

After their first bye week, the Spartans traveled to South Bend to renew the Megaphone Trophy rivalry, the teams' first meeting since 2013. Notre Dame, after an overtime loss to Texas and a defeat of Nevada, took on the Spartans in what some labelled a must-win for the Irish's playoff hopes. After returning the opening kickoff for a touchdown, Notre Dame had the play called back due to a holding call. Their first possession ended in a punt while the Spartans followed suit. Notre Dame took the early lead on their next possession going 91 yards on 10 plays capped by Deshone Kizer 14 yard run.

The Spartans attempted to answer on their next possession, but their drive ended on the second play of the second quarter as Devin Studstill intercepted a Tyler O'Connor pass at the Notre Dame three yard line. Momentum appeared to be in the Fighting Irish's favor, but their ensuing drive netted negative yards as MSU's defense stepped up. However, MSU's offense managed a three and out following the defense's stand. Momentum would change again on the ensuing punt which hit a Notre Dame player and was recovered by MSU on the Notre Dame 38. MSU took advantage on the next play as O'Connor completed a pass to freshman wide receiver Donnie Corley for a 38-yard touchdown pass. MSU used the swinging gate on the ensuing conversion to get the two-pointer and take the lead 8–7. Notre Dame turned the ball over again on a fumble on the first play of their next drive, but MSU could not capitalize and the team exchanged punts. With 4:35 remaining in the first half, MSU engineered an 11 play 92 yard drive that ended with R.J. Shelton scoring a 10-yard touchdown on a shovel pass and MSU extended the lead to 15–7 as half time neared.

The teams exchanged punts to open the second half, but momentum appeared to be on MSU's drive following a 10 play 75 yard drive as Gerald Holmes plunged into the endzone from three yards out and MSU increased their lead to double digits, 22–7.  On the ensuing possession, Michigan State linebacker Jon Reschke, with a severely bandaged hand, intercepted Kizer at the Notre Dame 39. Three plays later, LJ Scott scampered into the endzone from 9 yards out and the lead bulged to 29–7. Following a three and out again by Notre Dame, Gerald Holmes blasted through the line and scored on a 73-yard touchdown run. The rout appeared to be on as MSU led 36–7.

However, Notre Dame did not give in. As MSU appeared to sit back defensively, Notre Dame scored touchdowns on their next three possessions as the Spartan offense and defense did little to stop them. With 6:02 in the game and the lead having shrunk to 36–28, MSU had a chance to run out the clock. However, the possession gained only five yards and MSU punted with 4:18 remaining in the game. MSU's defense, having given up three straight touchdowns, needed a stop on the ensuing Notre Dame possession forcing Notre Dame in to a fourth and seven situation where the Irish chose to punt and hope to stop MSU's offense. With 3:11 remaining, the MSU offense took over at their own 14 needing at least one first down to seal the game. On third down, O'Connor hit Corley on a 28-yard pass for a first down and MSU was able to run out the clock holding off Notre Dame, 36–28. MSU moved to 2–0 on the young season as Notre Dame fell to 1–2.

Tyler O'Connor finished the day 19–26 for 241 yards, two touchdowns, and one interception. Gerald Holmes led the rushing attack as he amassed 100 yards on 13 carries as the team rushed for 260 yards. LJ Scott added 98 yards on 22 attempts. Donnie Corley led the receivers with four catches for 88 yards while R.J. Shelton hauled in eight balls for 80 yards. Both scored a touchdown.

Wisconsin

The Spartans and Badgers met for the first time in four years. Michigan State had won the previous meeting in overtime 16–13, snapping Wisconsin's 21 game home-winning streak in the process. MSU looked to be the team with momentum coming off a win over Notre Dame while Wisconsin had barely beat Georgia State. The Spartans were the first team to score, getting a 41-yard field goal from Michael Geiger on their second possession and jumping into the lead 3–0. However, the Badgers answered on the ensuing possession driving 65 yards before a one-yard pass from freshman quarter Alex Hornibrook to Eric Steffes put the Baders up 7–3. Neither team managed much on their next possessions and exchanged punts as the game moved to the second quarter.

On the Spartans' next drive, Tyler O'Connor was intercepted at the MSU 36 and Wisconsin took possession on the MSU 28 following the return. Seven plays later Corey Clement scored on a one-yard touchdown run, but the kick failed as Wisconsin increased its lead to 13–3. The Spartans responded with their longest drive of the game, but were turned away at the Wisconsin 23 and settled for a Michael Geiger 40-yard field goal to bring the score to 13–6. Wisconsin answered with a long drive of their own and looked to be adding to their lead before Hornibrook was intercepted as time expired.

Beginning the second half, Wisconsin went three and out, giving the Spartans a chance to cut into the Badger lead. However, on the ensuing possession, LJ Scott was hit, the ball popped loose, and was picked up and returned 66 yards by Leo Musso to extend the Badger lead to 20–6. MSU again managed little offensively before punting and Wisconsin increased the lead further by kicking a 41-yard field goal. Trailing 23–6, MSU's offense was against unable to muster anything and was forced to punt. However, a miscue on the punt allowed Wisconsin to take over on the five-yard line and Corey Clement scored his second touchdown of the game and move the lead to 30–6 with the less than four minutes remaining in the third quarter. The Spartans attempted to make comeback on their next possession, but a good drive into Wisconsin territory ended with another O'Connor interception.

Wisconsin took over on five minuted drive into the fourth quarter, but was forced to punt. MSU could not muster any further offense turning the ball over on downs and ending another drive with O'Connor's third interception of the game. MSU fell 30–6.

The Spartans only managed 75 yards rushing but did out-gaining Wisconsin 325 to 317 total yards, but turned the ball over four times and on fumbled punt play. Wisconsin rushed for 122 yards as they routed the Spartans. O'Connor was 20–43 with three interceptions. The loss marked the biggest loss at Spartan Stadium since the Spartans lost 42–14 to Penn State in 2009.

Indiana

The Spartans traveled to Indiana looking to make up for their loss to Wisconsin the previous week. Indiana figured to be a good opponent for the Spartans as MSU had not lost to Indiana since 2006. With the Old Brass Spittoon on the line, MSU started the game with an almost 10 minute drive aided by an Indiana pass interference call on a third down play. However, the drive sputtered near the Indiana 20-yard line and MSU settled for a 40-yard field goal attempt from Michael Geiger. The field goal was blocked and MSU settled for no points on their opening drive. Indiana's offense mustered little and punted the ball back to MSU who took over at their own 13. On the second play of the drive, Tyler O'Connor found R.J. Shelton on an 86-yard pitch and catch that put MSU up 7–0. The Hoosiers offense again managed little and the teams traded punts as the game moved into the second quarter.

With 11:43 remaining in the first half, MSU took over and drove the ball from their own 10-yard line to the Indiana 40. However, a bad shotgun snap ended in a fumble recovery for Indiana. Indiana quickly turned the ball back over to the Spartans as Vayante Copeland picked off Indiana QB Richard Lagow. MSU's offense could not take advantage and punted the ball back to Indiana. Indiana's offense moved the ball into MSU territory, but sputtered and settled for a 50-yard field goal attempt that was wide right. With 46 second remaining, the Spartan offense could not get in to scoring position and the half ended with MSU leading 7–0.

Indiana began the second half moving the ball well and pushed the ball to the MSU two-yard line before turning the ball over on downs instead of attempting a field goal. The Spartans and Hoosiers exchanged punts before MSU went 77 yards to increase their lead to 14–0 capped off by a 24-yard pass from O'Connor to Delton Williams. The game looked like MSU's for the taking, however, Indiana quickly answered on a trick play where Indiana QB Richard Lagow caught a pass from WR Mitchell Paige and scampered into the endzone from five yards out to cut the lead in half, 14–7.

The Spartans' next drive ended in another punt and the Hoosiers took over with just over 11 minutes remaining in the game. Indiana again pushed the ball down the field and Lagow found Ricky Jones on a pass for a 22-yard touchdown as Indiana tied it up, 14–14. Following a three and out for MSU, Indiana again easily moved down the field and Lagow threw his third touchdown of the game from 15 yards out to Mitchell Paige and the Spartans, who led most of the game, found themselves down 21–14 with under five minutes remaining. On the touchdown pass, DL Malik McDowell was ejected on a controversial targeting penalty as he hit Lagow. Reminiscent of the prior year's drive to win the Big Ten title game, MSU went on a 13 play, 75-yard drive to tie the game on what appeared to be a Gerald Holmes touchdown run. However, the play was reversed and MSU was left with a fourth and goal at the Indiana two-yard line. With 11 seconds remaining, O'Connor hit TE Josiah Price for the easy score and Michael Geiger tied itwith the extra point as the teams headed to overtime, 21–21.

MSU had the ball first in overtime, but O'Connor was sacked on second and third down, losing almost 10 yards. The Spartans were forced to settle for a Michael Geiger 49-yard field goal attempt which was short. Indiana took their possession needing only a field goal to win. The Spartan defense forced Indiana to attempt a 33-yard field goal which kicker Griffin Oakes missed. However, Drake Martinez was whistled for a leaping penalty as he jumped over the line attempting to block the field goal. Indiana was given a first down on the play and moved the ball to the MSU three-yard line before Griffin connected on at 20-yard field goal to win the game for Indiana, 24–21.

The win marked Indiana's first overtime win in six years. The loss marked MSU's first back-to-back losses since 2012. As a result of the loss, MSU dropped from the AP Poll for the first time since 2013.

BYU

Sources:

Looking to avoid their third straight loss, the Spartans returned home for a non-conference game against BYU. Michigan State scored a touchdown on its first drive, but the BYU defense shut down the Spartans for the remainder of the first half. Still, MSU led at the half 7–3. Following an MSU three-and-out to start the second half, the Cougars scored their first touchdown on a 13-play, 73 yard drive that ended with a Colby Pearson touchdown catch to give the Cougars the lead 10–7. Another three-and-out led to another long touchdown drive for the Cougars: 13 plays, 70 yards capped off Taysom Hill 12-yard touchdown run to extend the lead to 17–7. A Damian Terry interception on MSU's ensuing possession set the Cougars up for their third touchdown of the game and increased their lead to 24–7. MSU drew within 10 on the ensuing possession on a one-yard touchdown run by Terry, but the Cougars answered with an eight-play, 80-yard drive to end the game. The Spartans fell 31–14 and moved to 2–3 on the season.

Northwestern

MSU took the early lead at home against the Wildcats on a 15-yard touchdown pass from Brian Lewerke to Josiah Price. Clayton Thorson was intercepted on Northwestern's next possession and Justin Layne returned the pick 43 yards to give the Spartans a 14–0 lead. Northwestern answered late in the first quarter with a Justin Jackson 29-yard touchdown run to bring the Wildcats within seven. An MSU field goal preceded a 12-play, 75 yard touchdown drive by the Wildcats that put them within three points, 17–14. A poor kick return and MSU penalty on the ensuing kickoff left the Spartans at their own five-yard line. Two plays later, Northwestern defensive lineman Joe Gaziano sacked Lewerke for safety to bring the score to 17–16. The Wildcats took the lead on a field goal and led at the half 19–17. In the second half, the MSU defense fell apart allowing touchdown drives of 75 and 86 yards to give Northwestern the 33–17 lead. MSU brought the game within two points on R.J. Shelton 59-yard and 86-yard touchdown catches from Tyler O'Connor. However, Northwestern scored three touchdowns on their next three possessions, including a 95-yard kickoff return for a touchdown by Solomon Vault. An MSU touchdown and field goal brought the Spartans within 14 points, but it was too little late as MSU lost its fourth straight game, 54–40.

Maryland

Traveling to Maryland, the 2–4 Spartans looked to save their season against the Terrapins. On their second possession of the game, Brian Lewerke's pass from the 50 was intercepted at Maryland's four-yard line. The Terrapins answered with a 96-yard drive culminating with a Lorenzo Harrison run for eight yards to put the Terrapins up 8–0 with the two-point conversion. MSU would answer early in the second half with an LJ Scott 48-yard touchdown run to pull within one, 8–7. Maryland extended the lead to 14–7 after a missed extra point and MSU tied the game on a one-yard run by Gerald Holmes. In the second half, the Spartans took the lead on a Matt Geiger field goal, but the defense could not hold the lead. The Terrapins scored touchdowns on 75-yard and 82-yard drives to put the game away, 28–17. The loss was the fifth straight for the Spartans and the longest of Mark Dantonio's career at MSU.

Michigan

 	  	
  
In what was expected to be a Michigan blowout, the No. 2-ranked Wolverines took the lead on the Spartans, scoring on their first four possessions and taking a 27–10 lead at the half. However, in the second half, the MSU defense stepped up and shut down the Wolverine offense. The Spartan D held Michigan to a field goal, but the Spartan offense could not take full advantage. A Monty Madaris 20-yard pass from Brian Lewerke pulled the Spartans within 30–17 with seven minutes remaining in the game. A 64-yard drive stalled deep in Michigan territory and MSU turned the ball over on downs with 1:39 remaining. MSU did add another touchdown with one second remaining on a Donnie Corley five-yard touchdown pass from Tyler O'Connor. MSU attempted a two-point conversion following the score, but Michigan's all-everything player Jabril Peppers recovered a fumble to return the ball for a two-point conversion for the Wolverines. MSU fell 32–23 and moved to 2–6 and 0–5 on the season.

Illinois

Rutgers

Ohio State

Penn State

Rankings

Awards and honors

References

Michigan State
Michigan State Spartans football seasons
Michigan State Spartans football